is a railway station in Shūnan, Yamaguchi Prefecture, Japan, operated by West Japan Railway Company (JR West).

Lines
Fukugawa Station is served by the San'yō Main Line.

See also
 List of railway stations in Japan

External links
  

Railway stations in Yamaguchi Prefecture
Sanyō Main Line
Railway stations in Japan opened in 1898
Shūnan, Yamaguchi